The 2005 Virginia gubernatorial election was held on November 8, 2005 to elect the Governor of Virginia. The Democratic nominee, Lieutenant Governor Tim Kaine, the son-in-law to Linwood Holton, won the election. Virginia is the only state in the United States to prohibit governors from serving successive terms, meaning that the popular incumbent, Mark Warner, could not run for reelection.

While the previous Democratic Governor, Mark Warner, was credited with doing especially well for a Democrat in rural areas of the commonwealth, Kaine's win featured surprising triumphs in traditionally Republican areas such as Virginia Beach, Chesapeake, and the Northern Virginia suburbs of Prince William County and Loudoun County, as well as impressive showings in Democratic strongholds such as Richmond and Norfolk. This is the most recent election in which a Virginia governor and lieutenant governor of opposite parties were elected.

Primary elections

Democratic Party
Tim Kaine, Lieutenant Governor of Virginia and former Mayor of Richmond, Virginia

Republican Party
Jerry Kilgore, former Attorney General of Virginia
George Fitch, Mayor of Warrenton.

Independents
Russ Potts, Virginia State Senator from Winchester

General election
The general election was expected to be close, with Independent candidate Russ Potts as a possible spoiler candidate. Kaine remained behind in polls throughout most of the campaign, at one point 10 points behind Kilgore, but captured a slight lead in the final weeks of the campaign. Kaine led in some polls for the first time in October 2005, and held his lead into the final week before the election.

Kaine closely associated himself with popular outgoing Democratic Governor Mark Warner during his campaign; he won his race by a slightly larger margin than Warner. He promised homeowner tax relief, centrist fiscal leadership, and strong support for education.  A number of factors, from the sagging poll numbers of President George W. Bush to a public disgust over the death penalty ads run by Kilgore, have also been cited as key to his decisive win.

The election was the most expensive in Virginia history, with the candidates combined raising over $42 million

Campaign 
Kilgore resigned as Attorney General in February 2005 to run for Governor (as is the convention in Virginia) and easily won the primary election against Warrenton Mayor George B. Fitch to become the Republican nominee. In the general election, he ran against Democratic nominee Tim Kaine, the Lieutenant Governor of Virginia, and State Senator Russ Potts, a pro-choice Republican who ran as an independent candidate. Early in the race, Kilgore showed solid leads of ten points or more in the polls, but Kaine steadily closed the gap and ultimately defeated Kilgore by a margin of 52% to 46%.

Kilgore's campaign was at times criticized for taking steps to avoid debates; Kilgore refused to debate Potts for the majority of the campaign, at times leaving Kaine and Potts to debate each other in his absence. He agreed to debate only with Kaine, and only if the footage could not be aired in campaign commercials. During this debate, he refused to answer whether or not he would make abortion a crime. This apparent public moderation of his previously open and hard-line stance on abortion troubled some of his conservative supporters.

He was further criticized for failing to limit his negative advertisements to 50% of his campaign's total publicity as Kaine proposed. One such advertisement featured a father whose son had been murdered by a man who was on Virginia's death row; the father expressed doubt that the sentence would be carried out if Kaine were elected and alleged that Kaine would not even have authorized the execution of Adolf Hitler, based on an interview with the Richmond Times-Dispatch. The negative reaction to the mention of Hitler combined with Kaine's pledge to carry out the death penalty and explanation of his personal opposition as arising from his Catholic faith helped to neutralize what many observers thought would've been a potent issue for Kilgore.  Kaine's campaign also ran an ad entitled "Wrong" quoting many Virginia newspapers in their condemnation of Kilgore and his campaign ads which stated (all caps emphasis) "All these newspapers can't be WRONG: 'Jerry Kilgore's ads are a VILE attempt to manipulate for political gain. . . they TWIST the truth. . . and SMEAR Tim Kaine. . . Kilgore's attacks are DISHONEST. . . FALSELY accuse Kaine. . . and TAR a decent man. . . Kilgore CROSSED the line. . . DRAGGING Kaine's beliefs through the mud. . . Jerry Kilgore should APOLOGIZE to Tim Kaine.'"

In trying to explain how a solid Republican could lose a traditionally Republican state by such a large margin, political commentators cited numerous key factors. Kaine's campaign had many political advantages, including his association with the state's popular Democratic Governor Mark Warner and defense of Warner's 2004 budget priorities, his "response ads" to Kilgore's death penalty advertisements where he spoke to voters about his religious convictions and as mentioned above, reminded them about how a large cross-section of Virginia media strongly condemned Kilgore for his negative-Death Penalty ads, his relentless in-person campaigning across the state, and his opposition to tax increases. Experienced attorney Lawrence Roberts served as Kaine's campaign chairman. In contrast, Kilgore's campaign had many political disadvantages, including a backlash over the death penalty ads that Kilgore's campaign ran in the fall, the relatively low poll numbers of then-President George W. Bush at the time of the election, and a bitter division between the moderate and conservative wings of the Republican party over tax and spending priorities.

Debates 
Complete video of first debate, September 13, 2005
Complete video of second debate, October 9, 2005

Opinion Polls

Results

Results by county and Independent city

Balance of power

See also
Commonwealth of Virginia
List of governors of Virginia

References

External links
Official Results, Virginia State Board of Elections

Official campaign websites (Archived)
Tim Kaine
Jerry Kilgore
Russ Potts

Gubernatorial
2005
Virginia
Tim Kaine